The following Confederate army units and commanders fought in the Second Battle of Deep Bottom from August 14 to 20, 1864 of the American Civil War. The Union order of battle is listed separately

Abbreviations used

Military rank
 Gen = General
 LTG = Lieutenant General
 MG = Major General
 BG = Brigadier General
 Col = Colonel
 Ltc = Lieutenant Colonel

Other
 (w) = wounded
 (mw) = mortally wounded
 (k) = killed in action
 (c) = captured

Army of Northern Virginia
Gen Robert E. Lee

Infantry forces

Cavalry Corps

Sources
 Trudeau, Noah Andre. The Last Citadel: Petersburg, Virginia June 1864 – April 1865. Boston, Massachusetts: Little, Brown and Company, 1991. .

American Civil War orders of battle